Lutsk (Луцьк) was an anti-submarine corvette of the Ukrainian Navy. Board number U205 (to July 1994 was number 400, from 1994 until January 2007 — U200). In March 2014 Lutsk was captured by Russian forces during the Crimean crisis.

History 
Lutsk is the ship 1124ME project (NATO reporting name: Grisha V class, in the Soviet classification: Albatros class ).

The Russian type designation is Small Anti-Submarine Ship. The Grisha-class anti-submarine ship was designed to search for and destroy enemy submarines found in coastal areas. They were equipped with a variety of ASW weapons and an SA-N-4 surface-to-air missile launcher. All were fitted with retractable fin stabilizers. Some of them (the Grisha II class) were built for the border guards.

The Grisha V-class ships were built between 1985 and 2002. This incorporated further modifications with the twin  guns being replaced by a single  gun. Thirty ships were built. About 28 ships remain in the Russian Navy. Lutsk was launched on 22 May 1993 and alongside Ternopil, entered service on 16 February 2006 with the Ukrainian Navy.

On 20 March 2014, Lutsk was captured by Russian forces during the Crimean crisis. The ship was scheduled to be handed back to Ukraine in May 2014. But as of 6 August 2014 it was not; Russia suspended the return of Ukrainian Navy materials from Crimea to Ukraine proper because Ukraine did not renew its unilaterally declared ceasefire on 1 July 2014 in the War in Donbass.

Service 
The corvette was laid down on 11 January 1991 at the Leninska Kuznya shipyard. The actual building of the ship started on 27 December 1992 and the ship was launched on 22 May 1993.

The ship's crew began to move in on 14 October 1993. The corvette was moved from Kyiv to Mykolaiv between 4 and 16 November 1993. Five days later the corvette was moved again, this time to a port of Sevastopol. On 30 December 1993 an act was signed turning the ship over to the Ukrainian Navy. The Ukrainian naval flag was raised on the ship on 12 February 1994.

In January 2002 the corvette was added to Joint Rapid Reaction Force.

Beginning on 5 March 2014, Lutsk was blockaded in Streletska Bay at Sevastopol by Russian vessels. On 20 March 2014, Lutsk surrendered to the Black Sea Fleet and the Ukrainian personnel left the vessel.

Activity 

 July 1994 — the naval multinational exercise Breeze—94 (Bulgaria),
 August 1995 — the naval multinational exercise Breeze—95 (Bulgaria),
 August 1996 — the strategic exercise Sea—96,
 January 1997 — the first in the history of Naval Forces of Ukraine missile firing,
 April 1997 — the Ukrainian-Russian naval exercise,
 July 1997 — the naval multinational exercise Cooperative Partner—97 (Bulgaria),
 August 1997 — the naval multinational exercise Sea Breeze—97,
 November 1997 — the Ukrainian-Russian naval exercise,
 April 1998 — the Ukrainian-Russian naval exercise,
 June 1998 — the naval multinational exercise Cooperative Partner—98 (Romania),
 November 1998 — the naval multinational exercise Sea Breeze—98,
 April 1999 — naval tactical exercises,
 August 1999 — the Ukrainian-Russian naval exercise Farvater Miru—99,
 September 1999 — the strategic exercise Duel—99,
 April 2000 — naval tactical exercises,
 June 2000 — the naval multinational exercise Cooperative Partner—2000,
 July 2000 — the naval multinational exercise Breeze—2000,
 September 2000 — the naval multinational exercise Black Sea Partner—2000 Turkey,
 2001 — the naval multinational exercise Farvater Miru—2001, strategic exercise Duel—2001,
 2002 — the naval multinational exercise Breeze—2002, naval tactical exercises,
 2003 — the naval multinational exercises Farvater Miru—2003, Cooperative Partner—2003, Black Sea Partner—2003,
 2004 — the naval multinational exercise Cooperative Partner—2004, naval tactical exercises,
 2005 — the strategic exercise Reaction—2005,
 2007 — took part in NATO Active Endeavour anti-terrorist operation,
 2008 — the strategic exercise l—2008

References

External links
 Photogallery of Lutsk

Vessels captured from the Ukrainian Navy
Ships of the Russian Navy
1993 ships
Lutsk
Ships built at Kuznya na Rybalskomu
Annexation of Crimea by the Russian Federation
Corvettes of the Ukrainian Navy
Ships involved in the Russo-Ukrainian War